Pascal Terrasse (born October 26, 1964 in Bagnols-sur-Cèze, Gard) was a member of the National Assembly of France.  He represented the first legislative district of Ardèche department from 1997 to 2017, as a member of the Socialiste, radical, citoyen et divers gauche.

Pascal Terrasse was elected president of the conseil général of Ardèche on April 3, 2006 following the resignation of Michel Teston.

On June 17, 2007, he was re-elected to represent the first district with 62% of the votes cast.

References

External links
 Pascal Terrasse's official website

1964 births
Living people
People from Bagnols-sur-Cèze
Socialist Party (France) politicians
Deputies of the 11th National Assembly of the French Fifth Republic
Deputies of the 12th National Assembly of the French Fifth Republic
Deputies of the 13th National Assembly of the French Fifth Republic
Deputies of the 14th National Assembly of the French Fifth Republic